Adolfo Graciano Quimbamba (born 26 December 1982) is a retired Angolan basketball player. At  in height and 104 kg (229 pounds) in weight, he played as a small forward.

Quimbamba represented the Angolan senior team for the first time at the FIBA Africa Championship 2009. He saw action in five games off the bench for the Angolans, who won their seventh consecutive FIBA Africa Championship and qualified for the 2010 FIBA World Championship. He last played for ASA at the Angolan major basketball league BAI Basket in 2013.

References

1982 births
Angolan men's basketball players
Living people
Olympic basketball players of Angola
Small forwards
Atlético Sport Aviação basketball players
C.D. Primeiro de Agosto men's basketball players
African Games bronze medalists for Angola
African Games medalists in basketball
Competitors at the 2011 All-Africa Games